The Bay of Plenty Rugby Union (also referred to as "Bay of Plenty" or "BOPRU") is the governing body for rugby union in a portion of the Bay of Plenty Region of New Zealand. Its colours are dark blue and yellow in a hooped design. The BOPRU govern the running of the Bay of Plenty representative team which have won New Zealand's first-tier domestic competition National Provincial Championship (Air New Zealand Cup and ITM Cup) once. Their most recent victory was the 1976 competition, they were the first side to win the competition. Bay of Plenty also acts as a primary feeder to the Chiefs, who play in the Super Rugby competition.

The union also administers all club rugby within the region, including the Bayfair Baywide competition and other senior club rugby. As well, the union is responsible for school rugby.

History
Bay of Plenty played a prominent role in the early history of rugby in New Zealand. The 1888–89 New Zealand Natives (the first New Zealand representative rugby team to tour beyond Australia) included five Warbrick brothers from the small Bay of Plenty settlement of Matata. Dave Gallaher, the captain of the legendary 1905 All Black Originals, grew up in Katikati. But it was not until 1911 that a separate Bay of Plenty Rugby Football Union was established. Before then Bay of Plenty was included within the South Auckland union. The current nickname for the team is the "Steamers".

Representatives

Bay of Plenty-based players were amongst the most prominent in the formative years of the game, but it was not until 1911 that the Bay of Plenty union was fully affiliated to the national body. Up until this time the BOP union was included within the South Auckland union boundaries. As the boundaries of the new union grew, and new sub-unions were formed, the union achieved its first national representation when A.L. McLean was selected for the All Blacks in 1921. McLean was the first of 22 men who have represented New Zealand while wearing the blue and gold hoops, in addition to the many players who received their rugby education in the Bay of Plenty before achieving higher honours elsewhere. As the heartland of Maori rugby the region has produced a large number of Māori All Blacks, while age group and secondary school teams from throughout the union have also established a long and successful heritage that is the envy of many.

Great players

Sam Cane who hails from Reporoa is the most capped All Black who has represented Bay of Plenty. 
Cane has 70 caps for the New Zealand National team and has been the captain since the start of 2020.

Les McLean was the first of the 22 players who have so far been selected for the All Blacks from Bay of Plenty. He played as a forward in the second and third tests against the 1921 Springboks – and at full-back against New South Wales in 1923.

Hika Reid hails from Ngongotahā near Rotorua, Reid's grandfather, J. Hikatarewa, played for New Zealand Maori in 1913. Reid was selected for the All Blacks in 1980 when test incumbent Andy Dalton was unavailable for what turned out to be a disappointing tour of Australia. Reid's performances at hooker, however, were impressive. A dynamic runner with ball in hand, he revolutionised the way in which hookers played the game. Sean Fitzpatrick was the most famous of those to adopt this high-energy approach. His try in the second test victory over Australia in Brisbane has been described as one of 'the most spectacular tries in test history'. He started and finished a move that began 10 m from his own try line. Despite this sort of ability, for much of his career Reid was Andy Dalton's understudy. By 1986 he had also slipped behind Fitzpatrick, and he was overlooked for the 1987 World Cup.

Greg Rowlands, a 1976 All Black to Argentina, holds the record for the most games – 161 – and most points – 1008 – for Bay of Plenty.

Honours

NPC/Air New Zealand Cup/ITM Cup (1):

1976

Ranfurly Shield (1):

2004 (1)

Melrose Sevens (1):

1992

Stadia
As being a larger region than most, the Steamers are one of the few teams to have two home stadiums, the Tauranga Domain in Tauranga and Rotorua International Stadium in Rotorua.

Tauranga Domain
Tauranga Domain has a capacity of 5,000 people and hosted Bay of Plenty games up until 2000 and since 2015. There are also plans for a 20,000 seat boutique stadium, to help revitalise the city centre of Tauranga which has struggled due to the development of suburban malls and earthquake strengthening closing a number of CBD buildings.

Baypark Stadium
Built in 2000, opened in 2001 and formerly known as Bluechip stadium and Western Bay Stadium, Baypark stadium is a multi-purpose stadium that the Steamers along with Rotorua International Stadium. It has a capacity of 19,800, which was almost attained when Bay of Plenty had the Ranfurly Shield run of 2004. Baypark was subsequently shunned in favour of Tauranga Domain due to the stadium's poor surface and the lack of proximity between the fans and the players due to the racing track circling the pitch.

Rotorua International Stadium
With a capacity of 34,000, Rotorua International Stadium is one of the larger stadiums in New Zealand, but doesn't get the matches that will draw the crowds. It is one of the two stadiums that the Steamers use as a home field, with many considering it the home of Bay of Plenty Rugby. It is also known as "The Hangi Pit", because of the mud-pools around Rotorua.

Other representative teams
In addition to the Men's 1st XV, the BOPRU has a number of other representative teams for both Men and Women. BOPRU is part of the Women's Provincial Championship.

Club Rugby
The Bay of Plenty Rugby Union holds union-wide and sub-union competitions including the Kusabs Cup, the premier Bay of Plenty rugby trophy starting in 1912. It has 38 local clubs under affiliated with them and three sub-unions to be part of.
The Baywide competition runs for 20–21 weeks and split to four stages:
Local Sub-Union Competition
Baywide Round One
Baywide Championship Round
Bartercard Baywide Semi-finals and Finals Day

The 38 clubs are split into three sub-unions, the Central, Eastern and Western Sub-Unions.

Central

There are ten clubs in the Central Bay of Plenty sub-union.

Eastern

There are 14 clubs in the Eastern Bay of Plenty sub-union.

Western

There are 13 clubs in the Western Bay of Plenty sub-union.

Structure
Stage One runs for 6–7 weeks, clubs are put into their respective sub-unions and complete a local competition. 24 teams are put into 2 sections with 2 groups of 6 in each section. Each teams faces the other teams in their group once with the Rugby Union Bonus Points System used to determine their placings.

Championship Round
The four top placed teams after a round-robin from each group in the top section go on to compete in the Baywide Premier competition for the Kusabs Cup. The two bottom placed teams each group of section 1 and the two top placed teams from the two groups of section 2 go on to compete in the first division. The remaining eight teams compete in the second division. And division three is made of teams from the local competitions.

Each division goes through a round-robin where every team faces each other and the top four from each division goes on to the Bartercard Baywide Semi-finals and Finals Day.

Semi-finals and finals day
The semi-finals and finals are played over two weeks and the Premier Division Champions win the Kusabs Cup.
In recent years the Tauranga Raptors have won the premier title in the Bay of Plenty four consecutive times 2007–10.

Baywide List of Club Champions 
The Baywide Club Championship (rather than sub-union club championships) started in 1990, list of champions:

Bunnings NPC

All Blacks
This is a list of players who have represented New Zealand from the Bay of Plenty representative rugby union team. Players are listed by the decade they were first selected in and players in bold are current All Blacks.

1920–1929
Andrew Leslie McLean – 1921
Leslie Frank Cupples – 1924

1950–1959
William Ngataiawhio Gray – 1955
Richard James Conway – 1959

1960–1969
Eric James Anderson – 1960
Arthur Grahn Jennings – 1967

1970–1979
Alan Murray McNaughton – 1971
Grant Bernard Batty – 1972
Graeme Murray Crossman – 1974
Leonard John Brake – 1976
Gregory David Rowlands – 1976
Edward James Taite Stokes – 1976
Norman Mark Taylor – 1977

1980–1989
Hikatarewa Rockcliffe Reid – 1980
Frank Nuki Ken Shelford – 1981
Arthur Massey Stone – 1981
Gary John Braid – 1983

2000–2009
Kevin Senio – 2005
Mike Peter Delany – 2009
Tanerau Dylan Latimer – 2009

2010–2019
Sam Jordan Cane – 2012
Brodie Allan Retallick – 2012

References

External links
Official site
BOP Mafia Supporters Club
 Baypark Stadium Site
Bay of Plenty rugby (NZHistory.net.nz)

New Zealand rugby union governing bodies
Sport in the Bay of Plenty Region
Sports organizations established in 1911